Following the 1790 census, North Carolina's apportionment increased from 5 to 10 seats.

See also 
 United States House of Representatives elections, 1792 and 1793
 List of United States representatives from North Carolina

References 

North Carolina
1793
United States House of Representatives